The Anniston Nobles were a minor league baseball team based in Anniston, Alabama, United States, that operated in the Georgia–Alabama League from 1928 to 1930. Previously the Anniston Moulders had played in the league from 1913 to 1917.

External links
Baseball Reference

Defunct minor league baseball teams
Professional baseball teams in Alabama
Defunct Southeastern League teams
Defunct Georgia-Alabama League teams
Defunct Tennessee-Alabama League teams
Baseball teams established in 1904
Baseball teams disestablished in 1930
1928 establishments in Alabama
1930 disestablishments in Alabama
Defunct baseball teams in Alabama